Tinytim or TinyTIM may refer to:

Tinytim, the flowering plant Geocarpon minimum
TinyTIM, an online social medium

See also
Tiny Tim (disambiguation)